The 1969 Bandy World Championship was the sixth Bandy World Championship and was contested between three men's bandy playing nations.  The championship was played in Sweden from 8–16 February 1969.

Originally the tournament was to be arranged in Norway, but the Norwegians declined to participate and arrange the championship so Sweden had to take over. Norway did not want to be part of a tournament where the Soviet Union played, due to the Soviet and its allies invasion of Czechoslovakia the previous year.

The Soviet Union became champions.

Participants

Premier tour
 8 February
 Sweden-Finland 5–1
 9 February
 Soviet Union – Finland 10–1
 11 February
 Soviet Union – Sweden 4–2
 13 February
 Finland – Sweden 6–1
 15 February
 Soviet Union – Finland 5–2
 16 February
 Soviet Union – Sweden 2–1

References

1969
1969 in bandy
1969 in Swedish sport
International bandy competitions hosted by Sweden
February 1969 sports events in Europe
International sports boycotts